Jacquelyn J. Lahn (born August 3, 1952) is a retired American real estate appraiser and Republican politician.  She served one term in the Wisconsin State Assembly (1989–1991), representing Eau Claire County.

Biography
Lahn was born on August 3, 1952, in Eau Claire, Wisconsin, and attended Osseo-Fairchild High School. She attended the University of Wisconsin–Eau Claire and served in the United States Army from 1972 to 1977.

Political career
Lahn was elected to the Assembly in 1988. She is a Republican.

References

1952 births
Living people
Politicians from Eau Claire, Wisconsin
Republican Party members of the Wisconsin State Assembly
Women state legislators in Wisconsin
Military personnel from Wisconsin
United States Army soldiers
Female United States Army personnel
University of Wisconsin–Eau Claire alumni
21st-century American women